The Earl H. Ellis VFW Post #1362, located at 701 E. 1st St. in Pratt, Kansas, was built in 1939.  It was listed on the National Register of Historic Places in 2006.

It has been said to constitute "a good example of a late Art Deco structure featuring native stone construction."

It was deemed "significant architecturally and socially as a reflection of the history of the community of Pratt."

The listing included, in addition to the building, two contributing objects.

References

Clubhouses on the National Register of Historic Places in Kansas
Art Deco architecture in Kansas
Buildings and structures completed in 1939
Pratt County, Kansas
Veterans of Foreign Wars buildings